WKOW (channel 27) is a television station in Madison, Wisconsin, United States, affiliated with ABC and owned by Allen Media Broadcasting. The station's studios are located on Tokay Boulevard on Madison's west side, and its transmitter is located on South Pleasant View Road in the city's Junction Ridge neighborhood.

History

WKOW-TV (the suffix was dropped from the call sign in 2009) was launched on June 30, 1953, as Madison's first television station. The station was originally aligned with CBS and owned by the Monona Broadcasting Company, led by a group of local area businessmen along with WKOW radio (AM 1070, now WTSO). The WKOW call sign was an acknowledgment to Wisconsin's dairy industry, and featured a smiling bovine (or cow) alongside the emphasized "K-O-W" of the call sign. WKOW-AM-TV shared studios on Tokay Boulevard on Madison's west side beginning in 1953.

WKOW-TV remained with CBS until 1956, when CBS moved to the new WISC-TV. WKOW-TV subsequently joined ABC (who had been with WMTV on a secondary basis), while WKOW radio remained with CBS Radio. From January to August 1958, WKOW was part of the short-lived, Wisconsin-oriented Badger Television Network, alongside Milwaukee's WISN-TV and Green Bay's WFRV-TV. In 1960, Monona Broadcasting sold the station to Midcontinent Broadcasting. Midcontinent Broadcasting sold both WKOW and WAOW in Wausau to Horizon Communications in September 1970.

In 1974, Terry Shockley became manager of WKOW and its fellow sister stations that were part of the Wisconsin Television Network (which included WAOW in Wausau and WXOW in La Crosse). Horizon sold its stations, along with WKOW to Liberty Communications in 1978. Also during the 1970s, Horizon sold the radio stations in accordance with the FCC's "one to market" policy of that era. Despite the separate ownership, the renamed WTSO would remain at Tokay Boulevard alongside WKOW-TV through the 1980s and 1990s until becoming part of the Clear Channel Communications cluster, where it is today an all-sports station. (For a time in the 2000s, WKOW-TV supplied weather updates to the Clear Channel stations. As of October 2010, however, the station is no longer involved with WTSO or other Madison Clear Channel stations in any way.)

In January 1985, Liberty Television sold WKOW and its Wausau and La Crosse sister stations to Tak Communications, which would later purchase KITV in Honolulu, Hawaii and WGRZ-TV in Buffalo, New York. Tak filed for chapter 11 bankruptcy protection in the latter half of 1991 and went into receivership when the company's creditors seized its assets in early 1994. As part of Tak Communications' bankruptcy sale, Shockley purchased the four Wisconsin stations in 1995 (WKOW, WAOW, WXOW, and Eau Claire's WQOW) for his newly formed company, Shockley Communications. In June 2001, WKOW and its Wisconsin sister stations were acquired by Quincy Newspapers from Shockley.

On January 7, 2021, Quincy Media announced that it had put itself up for sale.  On February 1, Gray Television announced it would purchase Quincy's radio and TV properties for $925 million. As Gray already owns WMTV in the Madison market, and both that station and WKOW rank among the market's top four stations, it agreed that WKOW would be divested in order to satisfy FCC requirements. On April 29, Gray announced that WKOW would be divested to Allen Media Broadcasting. The $380 million deal includes WAOW, WXOW, WQOW, WREX in neighboring Rockford, Illinois, and other Quincy-owned stations where overlaps with Gray occur. The sale was officially completed on August 2, 2021.

Digital television
WKOW has been a pioneer of sorts in the world of digital terrestrial television. When the station launched high-definition broadcasts on October 29, 1998 (on digital channel 26), it became at the time the smallest United States television station to launch digital HD broadcasts. WKOW is still regularly used for digital television experiments, including an October 2014 test involving one of the competitors for the ATSC 3.0 standard in 4K resolution, backed by LG and Zenith.

In the late 2000s, WKOW would launch two digital subchannels alongside primary channel 27.1. Subchannel 27.2 was originally affiliated with the Retro Television Network, which was replaced on July 1, 2011 by the similarly-formatted MeTV. Subchannel 27.3 launched in March 2009 with the movie network This TV, which was replaced on September 2, 2015 at 12 noon by MeTV's sister network, Decades.

A caveat in Gray Television's purchase of Quincy Media's stations in 2021 involved WKOW's subchannels: In requiring that Gray spinoff WKOW and other stations to Allen Media Broadcasting, the U.S. Department of Justice deemed as an "excluded asset" the MeTV affiliation that WKOW had carried, meaning that Gray taking over the MeTV affiliation in Madison — as well as MeTV and The CW affiliations in Eau Claire, La Crosse, Wausau — would not adversely affect Allen Media's operations as "viable, independent competitors" in those markets. As a result on August 2, 2021, when Gray's purchase of Quincy Media and Allen Media's purchase of WKOW became final, the MeTV affiliation moved to a subchannel of Gray-owned WMTV.

To fill the void left by MeTV's departure, Decades would be temporarily simulcast on subchannels 27.2 and 27.3 for two weeks until August 19, 2021, when This TV returned to 27.3; the move reunited WKOW with This TV, which Allen Media purchased in late 2020.

Subchannel 27.2 has cleared any ABC programming that may be preempted on 27.1 for local sports and breaking news coverage (e.g. coverage of the WIAA state hockey and basketball tournaments carried each March on 27.1).

Programming
Syndicated programming on WKOW includes Live with Kelly and Ryan, Tamron Hall, and Dr. Phil.

WKOW also serves as the originating station for broadcasts of Wisconsin Interscholastic Athletic Association (WIAA) championship events. WKOW, its Allen Media-owned sister stations in Central and Western Wisconsin, and affiliates in the Milwaukee and Green Bay markets air WIAA boys' and girls' hockey and basketball state championships each March. (The hockey and boys' basketball tournaments are staged in Madison, the girls' basketball tournament in Green Bay.) WKOW is also an affiliate of the Green Bay Packers television network along with its AMG sisters, carrying the team's preseason games and in-season programming. By coincidence as part of AMG's investment in Diamond Sports Group, WKOW is now a half-sister operation of Bally Sports Wisconsin.

WKOW carries games for the Wisconsin Badgers football team that are selected to be broadcast by ABC.

News operation
WKOW presently broadcasts 24½ hours of local newscasts each week (with 4½ hours each weekday and 2 hours each on Saturdays and Sundays).

WKOW debuted a news department on the first day of its broadcasting in summer 1953. Local news, weather, and sports were seen in the initial shows. From 1999 to 2011, the station produced, through a news share agreement, the market's first nightly prime time newscast on Sinclair-owned Fox affiliate WMSN-TV (Fox 47 News at 9); the newscast originated from a secondary studio at WKOW, and although it featured WKOW personnel in the broadcasts, WMSN maintained separate weeknight news and sports anchors, as well as using theme music and graphics packages that are found on other Sinclair stations and that are different from that on WKOW's newscasts. (WISC-TV subchannel TVW had aired a prime-time newscast from 2004 to 2011; a third station, WBUW, had its own 9 p.m. newscast from 2003 until 2005.) WISC-TV took over the production of the WMSN newscast at the beginning of 2012.

On October 26, 2010, WKOW became the third station in Madison to upgrade newscasts to high definition, following WISC-TV and WMTV. The WMSN broadcasts, however, were still in 4:3 standard definition, as the station didn't have the necessary equipment to air local or syndicated HD programming.

Technical information

Subchannels
As of August 19, 2021, WKOW's digital signal is multiplexed as follows:

Analog-to-digital conversion
WKOW shut down its analog signal, over UHF channel 27, at 1 p.m. on February 17, 2009, the original target date in which full-power television stations in the United States were to transition from analog to digital broadcasts under federal mandate (which was later pushed back to June 12, 2009). The station's digital signal remained on its pre-transition UHF channel 26. Through the use of PSIP, digital television receivers display the station's virtual channel as its former UHF analog channel 27.

WKOW serves as the master hub for Allen Media Group's five-station network of ABC affiliates throughout western and northern Wisconsin.

References

External links

Television channels and stations established in 1953
KOW
Entertainment Studios
ABC network affiliates
Decades (TV network) affiliates
This TV affiliates
Court TV affiliates
True Crime Network affiliates
1953 establishments in Wisconsin